Fox Point is a neighborhood in the East Side of Providence, Rhode Island.  It is bounded by the Providence and Seekonk rivers, Interstate 195 and the College Hill and Wayland neighborhoods. Fox Point is the southernmost neighborhood in the East Side area of Providence.

Fox Point retains much of its historical character, with housing stock dating from the 18th and 19th centuries in much of the neighborhood. Vernacular interpretations of the Federal, Greek revival, and Italianate architectural styles are well represented West of Governor Street, while somewhat more recent construction dominates on Ives and Gano Streets.

History

Fox Point was originally used for farmland, but its economy quickly changed to maritime affairs with the construction of Providence's first port at India Point in 1680, becoming a major trading point in the Atlantic Triangular Trade of slaves, sugar cane, and rum between New England, the West Indies, and West Africa. 

The neighborhood derives its name from Tockwotten Hill, which was largely leveled (along with slum residences) as part of a public works project in the 19th century. The fill was used to reclaim part of the Seekonk River now consisting of Gano Street and land to the east of Gano Street.  Once the area's street grid had been laid, Fox Point developed as a residential neighborhood.

However, Fox Point became an attractive location for industry with the completion of the Boston and Providence Rail Road and regular steamship connections to ports along the East Coast.  The new industry, in turn, attracted many immigrants. Irish were the first wave, and the neighborhood became home to increasing numbers of Portuguese and Cape Verdeans by the second half of the 19th century. Many Portuguese-American institutions remain in Fox Point, though the Portuguese community is much smaller than it once was.

The proximity of Brown University has led to a combination of student housing and gentrification in the neighborhood that has displaced many of the long-term residents.

Demographics

According to the Providence Plan, a local nonprofit aimed at improving city life, 78.6% of Fox Point residents are white, well-above the citywide average. In addition, 6.4% of residents are Asian, slightly higher than the citywide average. African-Americans and Hispanics each comprise less than 5% of the population.

The median family income is $55,315, above the citywide average of $32,058. 8% of households live below the poverty line, while 2% of households receive some form of public assistance. 14% of children under the age of six have been exposed to hazardous amounts of lead. This is due to the prevalences of lead paint in older buildings.

Government
Fox Point is located within Ward One. Ward One is currently represented in the Providence City Council by Democrat John Goncalves.

Parks

India Point Park
India Point Park is located along the northern shore of Narragansett Bay, at Green Jacket Shoal and the confluence of the Seekonk and the Providence River. The park is the only large expanse of Bay-side shoreline in Providence preserved for public use.

Interstate 195 separates the park from the rest of Fox Point. Construction plans for the relocation of 195 include a new, larger pedestrian bridge over the interstate to allow better access between the park and the rest of India Point.

Friends of India Point Park is a notable citizens organization interested in maintaining the park.

Roger Williams Square and Slate Rock Park
A prominent boulder on the west shore of the Seekonk River (near the current Gano Park) was once one of Providence's most important historic landmarks. Slate Rock was said to be the spot where  a group of Narragansetts first welcomed the exiled Roger Williams in 1636 with the famous phrase "What cheer, netop?", and directed him to his eventual settlement location at the fork of the Woonasquatucket and Moshassuck Rivers. The historic rock was accidentally blown up by city workers in 1877. They were attempting to expose a buried portion of the stone, but used too much dynamite and the stone was "blasted to pieces." Pieces of the stone were later sold for souvenirs. A monument in Slate Rock Park at Roger Williams Square commemorates the site.

Gano Street Park
Gano Street Park along the Seekonk River has numerous athletic fields and a dog park

Schools
The Fox Point area includes two schools. One of these is the French-American School, a private school teaching in both French and English from kindergarten to eighth grade. It is located at 75 John Street, near the intersection of John and Hope Street. The other school in Fox Point is the Vartan Gregorian Elementary School, located at 455 Wickenden Street near the Fox Point Boys and Girls Club. It is part of the Providence public school system and teaches students from kindergarten to fifth grade.

Notable residents

 George M. Cohan, the noted American actor, singer, dancer, composer, playwright, and producer, was born on Wickenden Street. George M. Cohan Boulevard is named in his honor.

See also

References

External links

Go Providence: Fox Point/Wickenden Street, Providence, Rhode Island

Cape Verdean American history
Irish-American neighborhoods
Neighborhoods in Providence, Rhode Island
Portuguese-American culture in Rhode Island
Portuguese neighborhoods in the United States